Archdiocese of Lviv may refer to the following ecclesiastical jurisdictions with archiepiscopal see at Lviv (Lvov, Lemberg) in western Ukraine :

 Roman Catholic Archdiocese of Lviv, a Metropolitan archbishopric of the Latin Church
 Ukrainian Catholic Archeparchy of Lviv, an archeparchy of the Ukrainian Greek Catholic Church
 Armenian Catholic Archeparchy of Lviv